The 2020 Atlantic Hockey Tournament was the 16th Atlantic Hockey Tournament. It was scheduled to be played between March 6 and March 21, 2020 at home campus locations and at the HarborCenter in Buffalo, New York. On March 12, 2020, Atlantic Hockey announced that the remainder of the tournament was cancelled due to the coronavirus pandemic.

Format
The tournament featured four rounds of play. In the first round the sixth and eleventh, seventh and tenth, and eighth and ninth seeds, as determined by the conference regular season standings, played a best-of-three series with the winners advancing to the quarterfinals. The top five teams from the conference regular season standings received a bye to the quarterfinals. There, the first seed and lowest-ranked first-round winner, the second seed and second-highest-ranked first-round winner, the third seed and highest-ranked first-round winner, and the fourth seed and the fifth seed will play a best-of-three series, with the winners advancing to the semifinals. In the semifinals, the highest and lowest seeds and second-highest and second-lowest remaining seeds will play a single game each, with the winners advancing to the championship game. The tournament champion will receive an automatic bid to the 2020 NCAA Division I Men's Ice Hockey Tournament.

Conference standings

Bracket
Teams are reseeded for the quarterfinals and semifinals

Note: * denotes overtime period(s)

Results

Tournament awards

References

Atlantic Hockey Tournament
Atlantic Hockey Tournament
Atlantic Hockey Tournament
Atlantic Hockey Tournament